State Route 379 (SR 379, OH 379) is a north–south state highway located in the southeastern quadrant of the U.S. state of Ohio.

Route description
Along its path, State Route 379 passes through northwestern Monroe County and southwestern Belmont County.  This state highway is not included as a part of the National Highway System, a system of routes identified as being most important for the economy, mobility and defense of the nation.

History
The State Route 379 designation was assigned in 1935.  Originally, the highway was a spur route, running along its current alignment from its present northern terminus at State Route 147 southwesterly to the northwestern Monroe County hamlet of Calais.  Two years later, State Route 379 was extended to the southwest from Calais to end at its present southern terminus at State Route 78.

Major intersections

References

379
Transportation in Monroe County, Ohio
Transportation in Belmont County, Ohio